The national flag of the Islamic Emirate of Afghanistan, also used as the flag of the Taliban, consists of a white field with a black Shahada. It was adopted on 15 August 2021 with the victory of the Taliban in the 2001–2021 war. Since the Anglo-Afghan War of 1919, also known as the War of Independence, Afghanistan has used about 19 national flags, more than any other country in this period. The national flag had black, red and green colors most of the time during the period.

The tricolor flag of the internationally-recognized Islamic Republic of Afghanistan, which remains in use internationally and by resistance movements against the Taliban inside Afghanistan, has vertical black, red and green stripes. It has the national emblem in white at the center. The emblem, which is surrounded by sheaves of wheat, includes a Shahada; a Takbir; rays of sun; a mosque with a mihrab, minbar and two Afghan flags; the year 1298 (١۲۹٨) in the Solar Hijri calendar (i.e. Gregorian 1919); and an inscription stating Afghanistan. A similar flag with three vertical stripes of the same colors, which had an emblem surrounded by sheaves of wheat, was first flown by King Amanullah Khan in July 1928.

During the Afghan Independence Day rallies in Jalalabad and other cities on 18 and 19 August 2021, the Taliban killed three people and injured over a dozen others for removing Taliban flags and displaying the tricolor Afghan flags. The Taliban has issued a decree requiring the use of the Islamic Emirate's flag in all official settings.

Current symbolism 
The current flag of the Islamic Emirate of Afghanistan is a plain white flag with the black words of the shahada in the centre. The white stands for “the (Islamic Movement of Taliban’s) purity of faith and government”; the flag incorporated the shahada, the Islamic declaration of faith, after 1997.

The current national flag differs from the banners of other jihadist groups, including those of al-Qaeda and the Islamic State, in having white as its chief colour and the shahada in black, an inversion of the design of the coloring of most jihadist groups' banners. This current Afghan flag likely was inspired by the historic Umayyad caliphate, which began the Muslim conquest of the Indian subcontinent, the Ghazwa-e-Hind: Islam entered Afghanistan with the Umayyad invasion, begun in 663-665 A.D. as a prelude to the Muslim conquest of Transoxiana from 673 to 751 A.D.

Islamic Republic tricolor 

The national flag of the Islamic Republic of Afghanistan set out in the 2004 Constitution consists of a vertical tricolor with the classical National Emblem in the center. The latest version was adopted on August 19, 2013, but many similar tricolor designs had been in use throughout most of the 20th century, starting in 1928. Due to the lack of diplomatic recognition of the Taliban government, this tricolor remains in use by most diplomatic missions of Afghanistan, despite the overthrow of the Islamic Republic in 2021. It is also used by the Afghan diaspora and republican insurgents, and is considered a symbol of resistance within the country.

History of Afghanistan's tricolor flags 

The black color represents its troubled 19th century history as a protected state, the red color represents the blood of those who fought for independence (specifically, the Anglo-Afghan Treaty of 1919), and the green represents hope and prosperity for the future. Some have alternatively interpreted the black to represent history, the red to represent progress, and the green to represent either agricultural prosperity or Islam.

The tricolor was supposedly inspired by the Afghan King Amanullah Khan when visiting Europe with his wife in 1928. The original horizontal tricolor design was based on that of the Weimar Republic-era flag of Germany.

Almost every Afghan tricolor flag since 1928 has had the Emblem of Afghanistan in the center. Almost every emblem has had a mosque in it, which first appeared in 1901, and wheat, first appearing in 1928.

The last tricolor flag took its current form in 2002 with modifications later on in 2004 and 2013, with some variants containing differing coloured emblems.

Following the restoration of the Islamic Emirate of Afghanistan after the Fall of Kabul in 2021, protests took place in Jalalabad and other cities, where protesters were seen waving Afghan tricolor flags protesting its removal in defiance of Taliban rule, due to the reinstatement of the white Shahada flag and the abolishment of the former black, red, and green tricolor flag.

The tricolor flag was used by the Afghan delegation at the 2020 Summer Paralympics between 25 August and 5 September 2021, as well as at the 2021 Cricket T20 World Cup between 26 October and 4 November 2021, both after the fall of Kabul.

The color video approximations (valid for flags 1928–1978 and 1980–2021) are listed below:

Other flags

Gallery

Historical flags

See also 

Afghan rebel flags
Emblem of Afghanistan
Flags of Asia

Notes

References

External links 

Afghantribes: Afghan National Flags Timeline 
Encyclopedia Iranica: FLAGS OF AFGHANISTAN
Flag of Afghanistan
Flags of Afghanistan

National symbols of Afghanistan
 
Afghanistan
Afghanistan
Afghanistan